Greatest Hits is a compilation album by contemporary Christian music-pop singer Amy Grant, released on October 2, 2007 (see 2007 in music). It  was released by EMI CMG, Grant's new record label, to mark the start of her contract with them. It does not contain new songs, but the record label did remaster all of her songs. It is her latest career-spanning collection (following the 1986 compilation The Collection), and thus overlaps several tracks with both The Collection and Greatest Hits 1986–2004 (2004). As with The Collection, the songs are arranged in reverse chronological order. There is a special edition of the album that also contains a bonus DVD.

The album contains at least one song from all of Grant's non-Christmas studio albums at the time of this album's release, with the exception of Never Alone (1980), Legacy... Hymns and Faith (2002) and Rock of Ages... Hymns and Faith (2005). Notably missing from the collection are several of Grant's hits, including "Everywhere I Go", "Wise Up", "The Next Time I Fall" (a duet with Peter Cetera), and her cover version of Joni Mitchell's "Big Yellow Taxi".

Track listing

CD

DVD
The DVD contains:
 Music videos for:
 "Lead Me On"
 "Every Heartbeat"
 "Baby Baby"
 "House of Love"
 "Takes a Little Time"
 Interview: "Looking Back"
 Feature: Amy shares about her life
 Audio: Acoustic performance of "Takes a Little Time"
 Photo gallery
 Free Ringtone: "Takes a Little Time"
 Free trial membership to FOA (Friends of Amy - Grant's fan club)

Promotion
Grant promoted the hits album on her website using her vlog section, Simple Things. There are two videos used in promotion of the album. One is Grant playing acoustic guitar on an acoustic performance of her hit "Baby Baby", filmed at her house.

The other video has Grant showing many copies of the album around her house in various places such as by her alarm clock and by her pictures, while the acoustic "Baby Baby" is playing in the background. Towards the end of the video, Grant takes out copies of the liner notes from the washing machine, and also brings out copies of the album from the microwave oven.

Charts

Weekly charts

End of year charts

References

External links
 Amy Grant's Vlog Section
 Track Listing on Amy Grant's official website
 Track Listing + DVD on Amy Grant's official website

2007 greatest hits albums
2007 video albums
Music video compilation albums
Amy Grant compilation albums
Capitol Records compilation albums